Gorell may refer to:

Chris Gorell Barnes, English digital entrepreneur and marine conservationist, executive producer of the documentary The End of the Line
Frank Gorell (1927–1994), American politician, 47th Lieutenant Governor of Tennessee from 1967 to 1971
Jeff Gorell (born 1970), currently Deputy Mayor of the City of Los Angeles for Homeland Security and Public Safety
Arthur John Robin Gorell Milner (1934–2010), British computer scientist and a Turing Award winner

Barons:
Baron Gorell, of Brampton in the County of Derby, is a title in the Peerage of the United Kingdom
Gorell Barnes, 1st Baron Gorell PC (1848–1913), British lawyer and judge
Henry Barnes, 2nd Baron Gorell DSO (1882–1917), British Army officer
Ronald Barnes, 3rd Baron Gorell CBE MC (1884–1963), British peer, Liberal politician, poet, author and newspaper editor
Timothy Barnes, 4th Baron Gorell (1927–2007), British businessman
John Barnes, 5th Baron Gorell (born 1959), British Chartered Surveyor

See also
Goriella
Gorrell
Gouryella
Gowrelli